Terrell Lewis may refer to:

Terrell Lewis (footballer) (born 1988), English footballer
Terrell Lewis (American football) (born 1998), American football linebacker